Charles Williams (8 May 1893 – 7 September 1978) was a British composer and conductor, contributing music to over 50 films. While his career ran from 1934 through 1968, much of his work came to the big screen as stock music and was therefore uncredited.

Biography
Williams was born in London as Isaac Cozerbreit in 1893.  He began his career as a freelance violinist in theatres, cinemas and symphony orchestras and later studied composition with Norman O'Neill at the Royal Academy of Music. In 1933, he went to Gaumont British Films as composer and stayed there until 1939. He composed for many British films and radio shows and after the end of World War II, he became the conductor of the new Queen's Hall Light Orchestra. Later, he formed his own Concert Orchestra.

He died in Findon Valley, Worthing, West Sussex, aged 85.

Light music compositions
He composed many orchestral pieces and marches for his ensembles, which were recorded in the "Mood Music" category of light music and during the 1950s became familiar as film and television signature themes, often in his own recordings:
 "Blue Devils" is a popular march and Williams' first success as a composer. It was originally published as "The Kensington March" and written for the opening of the Odeon in Kensington in 1926, where Williams conducted the cinema orchestra. When he left the cinema in 1928 the march was renamed "Blue Devils" and first published under that name in 1929, dedicated to the Territorial Army regiment Kensington Rifles.
"Devil's Galop" was the theme tune to the radio serial Dick Barton.
"The Young Ballerina" accompanied The Potter's Wheel probably the most famous of the BBC's 1950s interludes.
"The Old Clockmaker" was chosen as the radio theme to Jennings at School
"Girls in Grey", originally written for the Women's Junior Air Corp during World War II later became known as the BBC Television Newsreel theme.
"High Adventure", adapted slightly, is still used as the signature tune of BBC Radio 2's Friday Night is Music Night.
"A Quiet Stroll" was used for BBC Television's Farming programme at its launch in 1957, as well as a more recent programme Tracks.
"Rhythm on Rails" was often used in the BBC Morning Music programmes, but contrary to some reports was not its signature tune.
 "Majestic Fanfare" (1935) was used by the Australian Broadcasting Corporation (ABC) for many years as the signature tune for its radio and television news broadcasts, beginning in 1952. A version as re-orchestrated by Richard Mills in 1988, is still used for radio news broadcasts, as of 2020.

He also composed the popular piano concerto pastiche, The Dream of Olwen, for the film While I Live.

Film compositions
 The Citadel – 1938
 Hey! Hey! USA – 1938
 Strange Boarders – 1938
 They Came by Night (1940)
 Tower of Terror (1941)
 My Wife's Family (1941)
 Kipps – 1941
 The Night Has Eyes – 1942
 The Young Mr. Pitt – 1942
 Women Aren't Angels – 1942
 Warn That Man – 1943
 Thursday's Child – 1943
 Medal for the General – 1944
 English Without Tears – 1944
 The Way to the Stars – 1945 (with Nicolas Brodszky)
 Carnival – 1946
 Quiet Weekend – 1946
 While I Live – 1947 ("The Dream of Olwen" was featured in this film)
 The Romantic Age – 1949 
 The Apartment – 1960 ("Jealous Lover", first used in The Romantic Age (1949) and also known as "Theme from The Apartment")

References
Notes

Bibliography
 Oxford Companion to Popular Music by Peter Gammond – published by Oxford University Press 1991 –

External links 
 
 A Sixth Garland of British Music

1893 births
1978 deaths
English film score composers
English male film score composers
Light music composers
Musicians from London
20th-century English composers
20th-century British male musicians